May Peak is a pyramidal peak rising to over  at the west side of Reedy Glacier, standing  west of Stich Peak in the Quartz Hills of Marie Byrd Land. It was mapped by the United States Geological Survey from surveys and U.S. Navy air photos, 1960–64, and was named by the Advisory Committee on Antarctic Names for Lieutenant Commander Robert L. May, a U.S. Navy helicopter pilot at McMurdo Station, 1962–63.

References

Mountains of Marie Byrd Land